Zoltan Silvashi (or Zoltán Szilvási;  born 20 June 1993 in Velyka Dobron, Zakarpattia Oblast, Ukraine) is a Ukrainian football defender who plays for Szentlőrinc SE in the Nemzeti Bajnokság III.

Silvashi spent some years in the Sportive Youth system in Uzhhorod. Then he played in the Ukrainian Premier League Reserves for FC Dnipro and SC Tavriya. From January 2014 he is playing for different Hungarian teams.

References

External links 
 
 
 Profile at MLSZ 

1993 births
Living people
Ukrainian footballers
Association football defenders
Mezőkövesdi SE footballers
BFC Siófok players
Kisvárda FC players
MŠK Rimavská Sobota players
Ukrainian expatriate footballers
Expatriate footballers in Hungary
Ukrainian expatriate sportspeople in Hungary
Expatriate footballers in Slovakia
Nemzeti Bajnokság I players